Kleinbaai is a settlement in Overberg District Municipality in the Western Cape province of South Africa.

Kleinbaai is located on the Danger Point Peninsula, 6 km from Gansbaai. A gravel road connects Kleinbaai to the Danger Point Lighthouse. This area is also well known for its whale-watching sites.

References

Populated places in the Overstrand Local Municipality